Sarah Clark may refer to:

 Sarah Clark (judoka) (born 1978), British judoka
 Sarah Clark (bishop) (born 1965), British Anglican bishop
 Sarah Clark (politician), member of the New York State Assembly
 Sarah Knauss, née Kemp, American supercentenarian, and oldest person ever from the United States

See also
Sarah Clarke (disambiguation)